N97 may refer to:
 Daxian N97, a Chinese mobile phone
 Djinba language
 , a submarine of the Royal Navy
 London Buses route N97
 Nebraska Highway 97, in the United States
 Nokia N97, a Finnish mobile phone